Walter Franklin Ripley (November 26, 1916 – October 7, 1990) was a relief pitcher who played in Major League Baseball.

Life
He was born in Worcester, Massachusetts. His son, Allen Ripley, was also a major league pitcher.

He broke Smoky Joe Wood's Red Sox record for youngest player by 40 days (Ripley was 18 years, 264 days; Wood was 18 years, 304 days.)

In two relief appearances, Ripley allowed four runs and seven hits, giving up three walks without strikeouts in 4.0 innings of work for a 9.00 earned run average. He did not have a decision or saves and never appeared in a major league game again.

Ripley died in Attleboro, Massachusetts, at the age of 73.

See also
List of second-generation Major League Baseball players

External links

Retrosheet

 

Boston Red Sox players
Major League Baseball pitchers
Baseball players from Worcester, Massachusetts
1916 births
1990 deaths